Ashley Elizabeth Gerasimovich (born February 1, 2004) is an American actress best known for her role as Delilah Parker in TBS comedy series The Detour.

Life and career
Gerasimovich was born in New York City, United States. She lives with her older sister, Alexa and younger sister, Erin.

She made her acting debut in the 2009 medical drama series Mercy. Her debut film role came out as Samantha Wilson in Doug Liman's 2010 biographical political drama film Fair Game.

Her other notable films include We Need to Talk About Kevin (2011), The Stand Up (2011) and Take Me to the River (2015).

Since 2016, she has starred in the TBS series, The Detour.

Filmography

Film

Television

References

External links
 

Living people
2004 births
American film actresses
21st-century American actresses
Actresses from New York City